František Vancák (born 19 July 1994) is a Slovak footballer who currently plays as a midfielder for  FC Košice. In the third league he had scored 1 goal in 11 games for the team.

Club career

MFK Košice
He made his debut for MFK Košice on 20 September 2014 against Spartak Myjava, entering in as a substitute in place of Miroslav Viazanko in the 89th minute of the match. Before moving to Lokomotíva Košice he was club captain of VSS Košice.

References

External links
 Eurofotbal profile
 
 Futbalnet profile
 MFK Košice profile

1994 births
Living people
Slovak footballers
Association football midfielders
FC VSS Košice players
FC Lokomotíva Košice players
FC Košice (2018) players
Slovak Super Liga players
2. Liga (Slovakia) players
3. Liga (Slovakia) players